Joel Parrish (born September 1, 1955) is a former American football offensive guard who played two seasons with the Toronto Argonauts of the Canadian Football League. He was drafted by the Cincinnati Bengals in the eleventh round of the 1977 NFL Draft. Parrish played college football at the University of Georgia and attended Coffee County High School in Douglas, Georgia. He was drafted by the Los Angeles Dodgers of Major League Baseball but chose to attend the University of Georgia. He was a consensus All-American in 1976. Parrish and four other men were arrested in 2001 in Australia on charges of drug trafficking after smuggling 2,457 pounds of cocaine into the country.

References

External links
Just Sports Stats

Living people
1955 births
Players of American football from Georgia (U.S. state)
American football offensive guards
Canadian football offensive linemen
American players of Canadian football
Georgia Bulldogs football players
Toronto Argonauts players
All-American college football players
People from Lowndes County, Georgia
People from Douglas, Georgia